9800 may refer to:
 The year 9800, in the 10th millennium.
 ATI Radeon 9800, a computer graphics card series
 NVIDIA GeForce 9800, a computer graphics card series
 BlackBerry Torch 9800, a smartphone by Research in Motion
 HP 9800 series, a series of Desktop Computer from Hewlett Packard